Church Lane may refer to:

 Church Lane (Brighton Beach Line)
 Church Lane, Letterkenny
 Church Lane, Oldham
 Church Lane (Randallstown)
 Church Lane Flood Meadow
 Church Laneham, in England

Road disambiguation pages
Odonyms referring to a building
Odonyms referring to religion